Leese-Stolzenau is a railway station located in Leese and near Stolzenau, Germany. The station is located on the Weser-Aller Railway. The train services are operated by Deutsche Bahn.

Train services
The following services currently call at the station:

Regional services  Nienburg - Minden - Bielefeld
Local services  Rotenburg - Verden - Nienburg - Minden

References

External links
 

Railway stations in Lower Saxony